St. Francis High School, also known as St. Francis or SFHS among its students and faculty, is a co-educational, Catholic college-preparatory school, located in Wheaton, Illinois and was founded in 1957, by the Christian Brothers, Franciscan Sisters, and Ladies of Loretto (Institute of the Blessed Virgin Mary).  It is currently operated by an independent Board of Directors.  St. Francis strives to prepare its students for college, and thus sets high academic standards.  The school has an enrollment of 731 students, as of 2018.

Curriculum highlights

 Full year and semester course offerings:  117
 Honors courses:  34
 Advanced Placement courses: 15
 16% of last years’ students scored 5
 Mobile Learning Initiative:  All students use the Microsoft Surface Pro
 Interactive Projectors in 70% of our classrooms
 Trips to France and Spain
 Chinese Language Courses

Pastoral ministry

Pastoral Ministry at St. Francis High School is inspired by the ideals and words of our patron, St. Francis of Assisi, “for it is in giving that we receive” and seeks to foster the personal and spiritual growth of each person in the school community.  It is a ministry to, for, by, and with young people, as well as the entire community —faculty, staff, parents, families and alumni. St. Francis High School shares the vision to live every day in the presence of Jesus Christ. Being a Catholic school it is very keen in the school's attempt to provide understanding for their religious community.

Pastoral Ministry provides opportunities for prayer and worship, retreats, justice and service, ministry leadership formation, pastoral care, and community building.

Co-curricular highlights

More than 30 special interest clubs and activities
 12 female and 12 male multi-level sports programs. 
 Full schedule of performing and visual arts including theatre, art, instrumental and vocal music
 Sixth Place Division 2A State Math Team
 First Place DuPage County and Third Place Overall for the Evergreen Club in the Northeastern Illinois Envirothon 
 IHSA State Series Achievements 2014-2015:  First Place Girls’ Volleyball, Football Semi-Finals, Third Place Baseball, Girls’ Soccer Regional Championship
 12 State Championships in Girls’ Volleyball
 2008 State 5A Championship in Football
 2012 State Championship in Girls’ Soccer
 Past regional and sectional IHSA championships in Boys' Cross Country, Girls Tennis, Boys Tennis, Baseball, Softball, Boys’ Basketball, Boys’ Soccer, Football, Track, Dance, Cheer, Math Team, Boys’ and Girls’ Volleyball, and Boys' and Girls' Golf
 63% of students participate in the performing arts
 65% of students participate in the athletic programs
 98% of students participate in co-curricular activities 
 Member of the Metro Suburban Conference (MSC) and the Girls Catholic Athletic Conference (GCAC)

Notable alumni
 John Cullerton (born 1948), politician and former president of the Illinois Senate (2009–2020)
 Kelsey Robinson (born 1992), volleyball player, Bronze medalist at the 2016 Summer Olympics, 2020 Olympic Gold Medalist
 Eric Stout (born 1993), pitcher for the Pittsburgh Pirates
 Andi Matichak (born 1994), actress and model
 John Vande Velde (born 1948), track cyclist, who competed at the 1968 Summer Olympics and 1972 Summer Olympics

References

External links
 

1957 establishments in Illinois
Buildings and structures in Wheaton, Illinois
Catholic secondary schools in Illinois
Educational institutions established in 1957
Roman Catholic Diocese of Joliet in Illinois
Schools in DuPage County, Illinois